The Graham F. Smith Peace Foundation Incorporated (formerly The Graham F. Smith Peace Trust Fund Incorporated) is a grassroots not-for-profit organisation that relies solely on the support of individuals and business’ through memberships and fundraising. It was established in 1989 to continue the work of Graham F. Smith, who spent his life working for peace, justice, human rights and improving the world in which we live. It is based in Adelaide South Australia.

Objectives of the Foundation

The Objectives of the Foundation are to promote literature, music, performing arts, visual arts, craft, design, film, video, television, radio, community arts, Aboriginal arts and movable cultural heritage that relate to human rights, social justice and environmental sustainability by:-

Promoting and educating the public on peace and justice at family, community and international level;
Promoting and educating the public on the reduction of injustice, racial tension, oppression and discrimination;
Increasing the understanding and cooperation between political, racial and ethnic groups;
Supporting the rights of indigenous peoples to economic self-determination;
Promoting and educating the public on the care of the environment;
Supporting oppressed people to control the environment for their daily needs;
Promoting and educating the public on ecological sustainable development;

The Foundation supports art projects (visual and performing) that accord with one or more of the objects through annual grants, commissions and sponsorship.

About Graham

A lifelong activist and educator, Graham F. Smith's passionate commitment to peace and freedom took him around the world and into the classroom. From his Australian Army experiences in the closing period of the Second World War, where he aided the struggle of the Indonesian people against Dutch colonialism, to his involvement in Cuba, Nicaragua, the Philippines and Vietnam, he always supported the struggle for independence and freedom.

Graham believed that people who are taught to think and to challenge and who are encouraged to expand their imagination can create a better world. Such was his belief in the power of education. His dedication to the egalitarian principles of socialism, democracy, peace, international understanding and the dignity of labour was the inspiration for the Peace Foundation that bears his name.

Recent Support

 2011 $10,000 Grant Winner - Knowing Home by No Strings Attached Theatre of Disability (NSA), towards the creative development of a theatre piece about the place and meaning of ‘home’ in the lives of 16 adult, disabled Aboriginal and Torres Strait Islanders (ATSI) performers.
 The Adelaide Fringe Festival Peace Award was created in 2011 and continued in 2012 and was open to all Fringe artists who promote human rights, social justice and environmental sustainability through their art. The foundation will be continuing this award in 2013.
 The Kaurna Reconciliation Public Project, 'Kaurna meyunna, Kaurna yerta tampendi' (recognising   Kaurna people and Kaurna land), was commissioned by the then Peace Trust. It consists of a monumental Reconciliation Artwork and a Walking Trail Guide. This project took over 4 years to complete. It was dedicated to the Kaurna People in September 2002.

Governance

The Foundation is governed by a board of directors and a Management Committee. Notable members of the Board and committee are

The Hon Stephanie Key MP, Member of State Parliament and former South Australian Government Minister
The Hon Kym Mayes, former Member State Parliament and former Minister
Gail Carnes, Former CEO of the Adelaide Fringe Festival

External links
The Graham F. Smith Peace Foundation Website

Foundations based in Australia